The 341st Bombardment Squadron is an inactive United States Air Force unit.  It was last assigned to the 4038th Strategic Wing.  It was last stationed at Dow Air Force Base, Maine, where it was inactivated on 1 February 1963.

The squadron was first activated in 1942 as a Boeing B-17 Flying Fortress squadron, assigned to the 97th Bombardment Group.  After training in the United States, it was one of the first units to deploy to the European Theater of Operations.  Following the invasion of North Africa, the squadron moved to the Mediterranean Theater of Operations, where it earned two Distinguished Unit Citations.  Following V-E Day, it returned to the United States and was inactivated.

The squadron was again activated as an element of Strategic Air Command in 1946.  It flew a series of Boeing bombers in the strategic deterrent role until inactivating.

History

World War II
Established as a Boeing B-17 Flying Fortress heavy bomb squadron in early 1942; trained under Third Air Force in Florida.  While training flew antisubmarine patrols over Gulf of Mexico and over Florida Atlantic coastline.   Deployed to European Theater of Operations in June 1942, being assigned to VIII Bomber Command in England with B-17E aircraft.

Combat operations by the group began on 17 August 1942, when the squadron participated in the first Eighth Air Force heavy bomber mission of the war, attacking the Rouen-Sotteville marshalling yards in France.  Continued long range strategic bombardment of occupied Europe, attacking airfields, marshalling yards, industries, naval installations, and other targets in France and the Low Countries.

Deployed to Algeria in November 1942, assigned to the new Twelfth Air Force in North Africa and upgraded to B-17Fs. Raided shipping in the Mediterranean Sea and airfields, docks, harbors, and marshalling yards in north Africa, southern France, Sardinia, Sicily, and the southern Italian mainland in a campaign to cut supply lines to German forces in north Africa. Helped force the capitulation of Pantelleria Island in June 1943. Bombed in preparation for and in support of the invasions of Sicily and southern Italy in the summer and fall of 1943.

Reassigned to the new Fifteenth Air Force and the Mediterranean Theater of Operations in southern Italy, November 1943, flying combination of B-17Fs and new B-17Gs.   From Southern Italy engaged in very long range strategic bombardment missions, attacking targets in Italy, France, Germany, Czechoslovakia, Austria, Hungary, Romania, Bulgaria, Yugoslavia, and Greece, attacking oil refineries, marshalling yards, aircraft factories, and other strategic objectives.  Participated in first shuttle-bombing mission to the Soviet Union (Operation Frantic) in June 1944.

Returned to the United States after the German Capitulation in May 1945, prepared for transition to Boeing B-29 Superfortress aircraft and deployment to Twentieth Air Force in the Pacific Theater.  Japanese Capitulation in August ended training activities, squadron was demobilized and inactivated in October.

Strategic Air Command

Reactivated in 1946 under Strategic Air Command.  Equipped with B-29 Superfortresses and participated in numerous exercises, operational readiness inspections, and overseas deployments.  Became part of SAC nuclear deterrent force.  Began upgrading to the new Boeing B-50 Superfortress, an advanced version of the B-29 in 1949. The B-50 gave the unit the capability to carry heavy loads of conventional weapons faster and farther as well as being designed for atomic bomb missions if necessary.

By 1951, the emergence of the Soviet MiG-15 interceptor in the skies of North Korea signaled the end of the propeller-driven B-50 as a first-line strategic bomber.  Received Boeing B-47 Stratojet jet bombers in 1955 and despite initial difficulties, the Stratojet became the mainstay of the medium-bombing strength of SAC all throughout the 1950s, deployed frequently to North Africa and England for Operation Reflex exercises.   Began sending its B-47s to AMARC at Davis–Monthan in 1959 when the aircraft was deemed no longer capable of penetrating Soviet airspace.

In 1960 was reassigned to SAC 4038th Strategic Wing, being re-equipped with Boeing B-52D Stratofortress intercontinental heavy bombers.   Moved to Dow Air Force Base, Maine to disperse the heavy bomber force.  Conducted worldwide strategic bombardment training missions and providing nuclear deterrent.     Was inactivated in 1963 when SAC inactivated its Strategic Wings, replacing them with permanent Air Force Wings.  Squadron was inactivated with aircraft/personnel/equipment being transferred to the 596th Bombardment Squadron, which was simultaneously organized.

Lineage
 Constituted as the 341st Bombardment Squadron (Heavy) on 28 January 1942
 Activated on 3 February 1942
 Redesignated 341st Bombardment Squadron, Heavy c. 6 March 1944
 Inactivated on 29 October 1945
 Redesignated 341st Bombardment Squadron, Very Heavy on 15 July 1946
 Activated on 4 August 1946
 Redesignated 341st Bombardment Squadron, Medium on 28 May 1948
 Redesignated: 341st Bombardment Squadron, Heavy' on 1 October 1959
 Discontinued and inactivated on 1 February 1963

Assignments
 97th Bombardment Group, 3 Feb 1942 – 29 Oct 1945
 97th Bombardment Group, 4 August 1946 (attached to 97th Bombardment Wing after February 1951)
 97th Bombardment Wing, 16 June 1952
 4038th Strategic Wing, 15 February 1960 – 1 February 1963

Stations

 MacDill Field, Florida, 3 February 1942
 Sarasota Army Air Field, Florida, 29 March – 16 May 1942
 RAF Polebrook (Station 110), England, 12 June 1942
 Maison Blanche Airport, Algeria, c. 16 November 1942
 Tafaraoui Airfield, Algeria, c. 22 November 1942
 Biskra Airfield, Algeria, 27 December 1942
 Chateau-dun-du-Rhumel Airfield, Algeria, 8 February 1943
 Pont du Fahs Airfield, Tunisia, 11 August 1943

 Depienne Airfield, Tunisia, 14 August 1943
 Cerignola Airfield, Italy, 12 December 1943
 Amendola Airfield, Italy, 17 January 1944
 Marcianise Airfield, Italy, c. 1–29 October 1945
 Smoky Hill Army Air Field (later Smoky Hill Air Force Base), Kansas, 4 August 1946
 Biggs Air Force Base, Texas, 17 May 1948
 Blytheville Air Force Base, Arkansas, 1 July 1959
 Dow Air Force Base, Maine, 15 February 1960 – 1 February 1963

Aircraft
 Boeing B-17 Flying Fortress, 1942–1945
 Boeing B-29 Superfortress, 1946–1950
 Boeing B-50 Superfortress, 1950–1955
 Boeing B-47 Stratojet, 1955–1959
 Boeing B-52 Stratofortress, 1960–1963

See also

 Boeing B-17 Flying Fortress Units of the Mediterranean Theater of Operations
 List of B-52 Units of the United States Air Force

References

Notes
 Explanatory notes

 Citations

Bibliography

 
 
 
 

Bombardment squadrons of the United States Air Force
Bombardment squadrons of the United States Army Air Forces
Military units and formations established in 1942
World War II strategic bombing units